Crotalus intermedius (common name Mexican small-headed rattlesnake) is a pit viper species found in central and southern Mexico. Like all other pit vipers, it is venomous. Three subspecies are currently recognized, including the nominate subspecies described here.

Description
Males are somewhat larger than females.

Distribution and habitat
This snake is found in central and southern Mexico, more specifically in southeastern Hidalgo, southern Tlaxcala, northeastern and south-central Puebla, west-central Veracruz, Oaxaca (in the Sierra Juárez, Cerro San Filipe and the surrounding mountains, Sierra de Cuatro Venados, Sierra Madre del Sur, and the Sierra de Mihuatlán), and in Guerrero (in the Sierra Madre del Sur, west of Chilpancingo). A type locality was not given in the original paper, but "Mexico" is inferred from the title. Smith and Taylor (1950) restricted it to "El Limón, Totalco, Veracruz, Mexico".

Much of the range of this species consists of seasonally dry pine-oak forest, but it has also been found in cloud forest near Omilteme in Guerrero, as well as in the desert near Cacaloapan in Puebla, and Pachuca in Hidalgo. It is found at elevations between 2,000 and 3,200 m.

Conservation status
This species is classified as Least Concern on the IUCN Red List (v3.1, 2001). Species are listed as such due to their wide distribution, presumed large population, or because they are unlikely to be declining fast enough to qualify for listing in a more threatened category. The population trend was stable when assessed in 2007.

Subspecies

References

Further reading
 Troschel, F.H. 1865. in Müller, Johann Wilhelm. 1865. Reisen in den Vereinigten Staaten, Canada und Mexiko. III. Beiträge zur Geschichte, Statistik und Zoologie von Mexiko. Dritte Abtheilung. Die Wirbelthiere Mexikos. III. Amphibia. Brockhaus. Leipzig. xiv + 643 pp.

External links
 

intermedius
Reptiles described in 1865
Endemic reptiles of Mexico